The 1999–2000 Wollongong Wolves season was the club's 20th season since its establishment in 1980. The club participated in the National Soccer League for the 19th time. They were crowned runners-up in the premiership and the champions of the finals series.

Players

Squad

Source: WorldFootball

Transfers in

Transfers out

Technical staff

Statistics

Squad statistics

Competitions

Overall

National Soccer League

League table

Results by round

Matches

Final Series

References

External links
 Official Website

Wollongong Wolves FC seasons
1999 in Australian soccer